Guloninae is a subfamily of the mammal family Mustelidae distributed across Eurasia and the Americas. It includes martens and the fisher, tayra and wolverine. These genera were formerly included within a paraphyletic definition of the mustelid subfamily Mustelinae.

Most gulonine species are arboreal to a degree. Some of the fashion furs come from this subfamily, e.g. sable, marten.

Species

Extant species

Extinct genera 
†Aragonictis Valenciano et al., 2022 - Middle Miocene Europe
 A. araid
†Circamustela Petter, 1967 - Middle to Late Miocene Europe
 C. dechaseauxi
 C. peignei
 C.? laevidens
†Dehmictis Ginsburg and Morales, 1992 - Early Miocene Europe
†Eiricitis  - Early Pliocene Asia
 E. pachygnatha
†Laphictis Viret, 1933
†Ischyrictis Helbing, 1930
†Plesiogulo? Zdansky, 1924 - Middle Miocene to Pliocene
 P. brachygnathus (Schlosser, 1903)
 P. botori Haile-Selassie, Hlusko & Howell, 2004
 P. crassa Teilhard de Chardin, 1945
 P. marshalli (Martin, 1928)
 P. lindsayi Harrison, 1981
 P. monspessulanus Viret, 1939
 P. praecocidens Kurtén, 1970
†Sinictis Zdansky, 1924
 S. dolichognathus
†Sminthosinis Bjork, 1970 - Middle Miocene North America
 S. bowleri

References

External links 

 
Taxa named by John Edward Gray